An Election to Pembrokeshire County Council took place on 5 May 2022 to elect 60 members to Pembrokeshire County Council, as part of wider local elections across Wales and the UK. The election was preceded by the 2017 election. It will be followed by the 2027 election.

Boundary changes
A number of boundary changes took place following a review by the Local Government Boundary Commission for Wales. 29 of the existing 60 wards remained unchanged although there were some changes to ward names.

Of the remaining wards:
 The existing Llanrhian ward consisting of the communities of Llanrhian and Mathry together with the community of Pencaer (previously in the Scleddau ward) were combined to create a new electoral ward named Llanrhian.
 The communities of Cwm Gwaun and Puncheston (previously in the Dinas Cross ward) and the community of Scleddau (previously in the Scleddau ward) were combined to create a new electoral ward named Bro Gwaun.
 The existing Newport ward was combined with the community of Dinas Cross to create a new electoral ward named Newport and Dinas.
The above changes result in a net loss of one seat in this part of the county.

 The communities of Cilgerran and Eglwyswrw were combined to create a new electoral ward named Cilgerran
 The existing Clydau ward consisting of the communities of Boncath and Clydau with the community of Manordeifi (previously in the Cilgerran ward) were combined to create a new electoral ward named Boncath and Clydau.
 The communities of Crymych and Mynachlog-ddu (previously in the Maenclochog ward) were combined to create a new ward named Crymych and Mynachlog-ddu.
 The existing Maenclochog ward was replaced by a new ward of the same name comprising the communities of Clunderwen, Llandissilio West and Maenclochog but the communities of Mynachlog-ddu and New Moat were moved to other wards.
 The existing Wiston ward was replaced by a new ward of the same name. It continued to include the communities of Ambleston and Wiston and the community of New Moat was added. The community of Spittal was moved to another ward.
 The existing Rudbaxton ward was combined with the community of Spittal (previously in the Wiston ward) to create a new electoral ward named Rudbaxton and Spittal.
The number of seats in this part of the county remained unchanged.

 The existing Camrose ward was replaced with a new ward of the same ward comprising only the community of Camrose.
 The existing The Havens ward was replaced by a ward of the same name including the communities of Nolton and Roch (previously in the Camrose ward) and The Havens.
 The existing St Ishmaels ward consisting of the communities of Dale, Herbrandston, Marloes and St Brides and St Ishmaels, together with the communities of Tiers Cross and Walwyn's Castle were combined to create a new electoral ward named St Ishmaels.
 The existing Johnston ward was replaced with a new ward of the same ward comprising only the community of Johnston.
The number of seats in this part of the county remained unchanged.

 In Milford Haven, a number of limited changes were made to ward boundaries, but the five wards continued to elect one councillor each.

 The existing Pembroke Dock Pennar ward was divided to create two new wards, named Pembroke Dock: Pennar and Pembroke Dock: Bufferland.
 The boundaries of the existing Pembroke Dock Central and Pembroke Dock Llanion were amended to create two new wards, named Pembroke Dock: Bush and Pembroke Dock: Central
 The existing Pembroke Monkton and Pembroke St Mary South wards together with part of the Pembroke St Michael ward were merged to create a new two member ward named Pembroke: Monkton and St Mary South.
 The existing Pembroke St Michael ward was replaced with a new ward of the same name, but with part of the ward transferred to Pembroke: Monkton and St Mary South.
There was an increase of one in the number of seats in this part of the county.

 The existing Manorbier ward, minus a part of the community of St Florence, was combined with the community of Penally to create a new electoral ward named Manorbier and Penally.
 The communities of St Florence and St Mary Out Liberty were combined to create a new electoral ward named St Florence and St Mary Out Liberty.
 The existing Amroth ward was combined with the northern part of the Saundersfoot ward to create a new electoral ward named Amroth and Saundersfoot North.
 The remainder of the Saundersfoot ward would form a new electoral ward named Saundersfoot South.
 The existing Carew ward was combined with the community of Jeffreyston (previously in East Williamston ward) to create a new electoral ward named Carew and Jeffreyston.
 The existing East Williamston ward was replaced by a ward of the same name minus the community of Jeffreyston.

Candidates
Nineteen seats (out of the sixty available) had candidates elected unopposed. All nineteen unopposed candidates were members of the previous council.

Results

|-bgcolor=#F6F6F6
| colspan=2 style="text-align: right; margin-right: 1em" | Total
| style="text-align: right;" | 60
| colspan=5 |
| style="text-align: right;" | 28,371
| style="text-align: right;" | 
|-
|}

Ward results
Nominations closed on 5 April 2022. The results were counted on 6 May 2022.

Amroth and Saundersfoot North

Boncath and Clydau

Bro Gwaun

Burton

Camrose

Carew and Jeffreyston

Cilgerran and Eglwyswrw

Crymych and Mynachlog-Ddu

East Williamston

Fishguard North East

Fishguard North West

Goodwick

Haverfordwest: Castle

Haverfordwest Garth

Haverfordwest Portfield

Haverfordwest Prendergast

Haverfordwest Priory

Hundleton

Johnston

Kilgetty and Begelly

Lampeter Velfrey

Lamphey

Letterston

Llangwm

Llanrhian

Maenclochog

Manorbier and Penally

Martletwy

Merlin’s Bridge

Milford Central

Milford East

Milford Hakin

Milford Hubberston

Milford North

Milford West

Narberth

Narberth Rural

Newport and Dinas

Neyland East

Neyland West

Pembroke Monkton and St Mary South (two seats)

Pembroke St Mary North

Pembroke St Michael

Pembroke Dock, Bufferland

Pembroke Dock, Bush

Pembroke Dock, Central

Pembroke Dock, Market

Pembroke Dock, Pennar

Rudbaxton and Spittal

St David's

St Dogmaels

St Florence and St Mary Out Liberty

St Ishmael's

Saundersfoot South

Solva

Tenby North

Tenby South

The Havens

Wiston

References

Pembrokeshire
Pembrokeshire County Council elections